Lebanese people in South Africa have a population exceeding 5,100 and other estimates report a total of 20,000 Lebanese in South Africa.  In addition, an increasing number of Lebanese students seeking education and career opportunities opted for the country in light of its relatively reputable institutions across the Middle East. Most of the Lebanese people in South Africa live mainly in the cities of Johannesburg and Cape Town.

History
The history of the Lebanese community goes back to the late 19th century, when the first immigrants arrived in Johannesburg, the biggest city in the Transvaal (province) coming from Sebhel, Mesyara, Becharre, Hadath El-Joube, Maghdoushe and other places. It is recorded that in 1896 the first Maronite and Lebanese immigrants arrived in Durban, Cape Town, and Mozambique, and congregated around their local Catholic churches. The majority of the Lebanese immigrants were Maronite and being concerned about keeping their Maronite faith alive in a new country, they wrote to the Maronite Patriarch, insisting on the need for a Maronite priest to come to South Africa to continue their tradition and the Maronite rite. In 1905, Patriarch Elias Peter Hoayek sent Father Emmanuel El-Fadle to South Africa from Kfarhata–Elzawye, North Lebanon. Father El-Fadle converted a building in Johannesburg into a church and residence. 

In 1910, Father Ashkar arrived to build a church and a home for the priests. The Patriarch, then sent another priest to assist – Father Wakim Estphan. Fr. Ashkar returned to Lebanon and retired in 1928. The mission was then handed over to the Congregation of Maronite Lebanese Missionaries. Father Yousef Juan, who was appointed as a temporary visitor, received instruction from the Patriarch and the General Superior for Father Yousef Moubarak to succeed him in serving the South African Maronite community. The Congregation of Maronite Lebanese Missionaries have since served in South Africa among other countries and continue in their mission in serving and assisting in the Maronite rite.

Apartheid
Lebanese people living during the apartheid era were only classified as white from 1914. They were originally not considered as such, instead being classified as Asian South African. The white status of the Lebanese community was first affirmed in 1914, when Moses Gandur, a Maronite from Syria, sued the South African government, as he was initially denied the right to purchase land in Johannesburg due to being classified as non-white. Gandur's lawyers successfully argued that the Lebanese and Syrians originated from the Canaan, the birth place of Christianity and Judaism, and that the laws didn't target Jews, who were also part of the Semitic race. Therefore, if other people from the Levant were being subjected to those laws, then so should the Jews. From this point on, Lebanese people in South Africa were classified as white, and this status was maintained after the Population Registration Act came into force in 1950, although immigration from Lebanon and Syria was restricted.

Through this time period, Lebanese South Africans generally enjoyed the same high living standards as other white South Africans. However, the Lebanese community maintained a silent (if not timid) opposition to apartheid and the National Party.

Lebanese people in South Africa
Fulton Allem, professional golfer
A. C. Chemaly, general officer in the South African Army
Ken Costa, London-based South African banker and Christian philanthropist 
Al Debbo, actor and comedian
Pierre Issa, professional football (soccer) player
Azar Jammine, political economist
Joseph Rahme, professional tennis player
John Shalala, businessman and CEO of Jetline group of companies.
Michael Sutherland, South African-born Australian politician 
Allan Thomas, professional footballer
Vic Toweel, professional boxer
Willie Toweel, professional boxer
Leanne Manas, media personality

See also
 Arab diaspora
 Lebanese diaspora
 Lebanese people in Ivory Coast
 Lebanese people in Senegal
 Lebanese people in Sierra Leone

References

External links

Ethnic groups in South Africa
Lebanese expatriates in South Africa 
Lebanon–South Africa relations
South African people of Lebanese descent 
South Africa
South Africa
White South African people